The classical education movement includes a growing number of organizations taking renewed inspiration from a traditional and historic liberal arts education and that focuses human formation and learning on the liberal arts (including the natural sciences) as well as canons of classical literature, the fine arts, and the history of civilization. While schools in the movement vary in their use of these categories, the general goal of the classical education movement is to encourage this group of studies within the hundreds of contemporary schools involved (both independent and public charter) as well as the thousands of homeschooling communities. This movement has inspired multiple graduate programs and colleges as well as Principia: A Journal of Classical Education (a peer-reviewed scholarly journal that publishes articles, policy research, editorials, and reviews related to the history, theory, practice, and pedagogy of classic liberal arts education and contemporary classical schools, colleges, and universities).

Over 300 classical Christian schools and over 200 classical charter schools are members of the Association of Classical Christian Schools. Almost 200 classical Catholic schools are part of the Institute for Catholic Liberal Education. The U.S. has many classical homeschooling communities, with over 1000 communities that are part of Classical Conversations, and over 100 that are part of the Scholé Communities network. There are also hundreds of public charter classical schools including networks such as the Barney Charter School Initiative and Great Hearts Academies. Nyansa Classical Community also provides after-school programs.

Recent history 
This movement has been mentioned in stories by Stanley Fish in The New York Times, Louis Markos in Christianity Today, as well as others in the Carolina Journal, The College Fix, and more.

Several new organizations and publishers have emerged in support of the growing classical education movement, including Veritas Press, Classical Academic Press (cofounded by Christopher Perrin), Memoria Press, Canon Press, the Circe Institute, Association of Classical Christian Schools, Society for Classical Learning, the Institute for Classical Education, the Classic Learning Test, and the Institute for Catholic Liberal Education.

The term "classical education" has been used in Western culture for several centuries, with each era modifying the definition and adding its own selection of topics.  By the end of the 18th century, in addition to the trivium and quadrivium of the Middle Ages, the definition of a classical education embraced study of literature, poetry, drama, philosophy, history, art, and languages.

In the 20th and 21st centuries, the term "classical education" has been used to refer to a broad-based study of the liberal arts and sciences, in contrast to a practical or pre-professional program.

A number of informal groups and professional organizations have led the classical education movement in the past century. Within the secular classical movement, Mortimer Adler and Robert Hutchins set forth the "Great Books" of Western civilization as the center stage for a classical education curriculum in the 1930s.  Some public schools (primarily charters) have structured their curricula and pedagogy around the trivium and integrate the teaching of values (sometimes called "character education") into the mainstream classroom.

Three phases of modern education linked to classical education 
The classical education movement has borrowed terms used in educational history to name three phases of education.

 "Primary education" teaches students how to learn.
 "Secondary education" then teaches a conceptual framework that can hold all human knowledge (history), fills in basic facts and practices of major fields of knowledge, and develops the fundamental skills of every major human activity.
 "Tertiary education" then prepares a person to pursue an educated profession such as law, theology, military strategy, medicine, or science.

Primary education – the trivium 

Primary education is divided into three stages using terms introduced by Dorothy Sayers in her essay "The Lost Tools of Learning": "poll-parrot", "pert", and poetic". According to Sayers, these phases are roughly coordinated with human development and would ideally be coordinated with each individual student's development.

Sayers connects her three stages with the three liberal language arts (trivium): grammar, logic, and rhetoric, respectively. While grammar, logic, and rhetoric are taught as subjects in classical schools, many schools also use these three arts as a paradigm for child development.

Logic and rhetoric were often taught in part by the Socratic method, in which the teacher raises questions and the class discusses them.  By controlling the pace, the teacher can keep the class very lively, yet disciplined.

Grammar 
Grammar consists of language skills such as reading and the mechanics of writing.  An important goal of grammar is to acquire as many words and manage as many concepts as possible so as to be able to express and understand clearly concepts of varying degrees of complexity.  Classical education traditionally included study of Latin and Greek to reinforce understanding of the workings of languages and allow students to read the classics of western civilization untranslated.

Logic 
Logic is the process of correct reasoning.  The traditional text for teaching logic was Aristotle's Logic.  In the modern renaissance of classical education, this logic stage (or dialectic stage) refers to the junior high or middle school aged student, who developmentally is beginning to question ideas and authority, and truly enjoys a debate or an argument.  Training in logic, both formal and informal, enables students to critically examine arguments and to analyze their own. The goal of the logic stage is to train the student's mind not only to grasp information, but to find the analytical connections between seemingly different facts/ideas, to find out why something is true, or why something else is false.

Rhetoric 
Rhetorical debate and composition are taught to somewhat older (often high-school-aged) students, who by this point in their education have the concepts and logic to criticize their own work and persuade others.  According to Aristotle, "Rhetoric is the counterpart of dialectic", concerned with finding "all the available means of persuasion". Students learn to articulate answers to important questions in their own words, to try to persuade others with these facts, and to defend ideas against rebuttal.  The student learns to reason correctly in the Logic stage so that they can now apply those skills to Rhetoric.  Traditionally, students would read and emulate classical poets in learning how to present their arguments well.

Secondary education – the quadrivium 
Secondary education, classically the quadrivium or "four ways", consists of arithmetic, geometry, music, and astronomy. Sometimes architecture is taught alongside these, often from the works of Vitruvius. History is taught to provide a context and show political and military development.  The classic texts were from ancient authors such as Herodotus, Thucydides, Livy, Cicero, and Tacitus. Biographies were often assigned as well, with the classic example being Plutarch's Lives.  Biographies help show how persons behave in their context, and the wide ranges of professions and options that exist.  As more modern texts became available, these were often added to the curriculum.

In modern terms, these fields might be called history, natural science, accounting and business, fine arts (at least two, one to amuse companions, and another to decorate one's domicile), military strategy and tactics, engineering, agronomy, and architecture.

These are taught in a matrix of history, reviewing the natural development of each field for each phase of the trivium.  That is, in a perfect classical education, the historical study is reviewed three times: first to learn the grammar (the concepts, terms and skills in the order developed), next time the logic (how these elements could be assembled), and finally the rhetoric, how to produce good, humanly useful and beautiful objects that satisfy the grammar and logic of the field. History is the unifying conceptual framework, because history is the study of everything that has occurred before the present.

Classical educators consider the Socratic method to be the best technique for teaching critical thinking.  In-class discussion and critiques are essential in order for students to recognize and internalize critical thinking techniques.  This method is widely used to teach both philosophy and law.  It is currently rare in other contexts.  Essentially, the teacher referees the students' discussions, asks leading questions, and may refer to facts, but never gives a conclusion until at least one student reaches that conclusion.  The learning is most effective when the students compete strongly, even viciously in the argument, but always according to well-accepted rules of correct reasoning.  That is, fallacies should not be allowed by the teacher.

By completing a project in each major field of human effort, the student can develop a personal preference for further education and professional training.

Tertiary education – the apprenticeship 
Historically, tertiary education was usually an apprenticeship to a person with the desired profession.  Most often, the understudy was called a "secretary" and had the duty of carrying on all the normal business of the "master." Philosophy and Theology were both widely taught as tertiary subjects in Universities, however.

The early biographies of nobles show probably the ultimate form of classical education: a tutor.  One early, much-emulated classic example is of this tutor system is of Alexander the Great, who was tutored by Aristotle.

Interpretations of classical education

Classical education in schools 
A number of classical schools have been established within the public/secular sector.  These schools, primarily founded as charter schools, also structure their curricula and pedagogy around the trivium and integrate the teaching of values (sometimes called "character education") into the mainstream classroom with or without involving any particular religious perspectives. The Well-Trained Mind: A Guide to the Classical Education You Never Had, by Susan Wise Bauer, is a modern reference on classical education. It provides a history of classical education, an overview of the methodology and philosophy of classical education, and annotated lists of books divided by grade and topic that list the best books for classical education in each category.

Another important book summarizing the history and philosophy of classical education is the Liberal Arts Tradition: A Philosophy of Christian Classical Education by Kevin Clark and Ravi Jain. Written by two veteran teachers from a classical school in Orlando, Florida, the book describes the ways in which the classical curriculum of the liberal arts developed and was deployed throughout the centuries. The authors present an overview of the classical liberals using the paradigm of piety, gymnastic, music, the seven liberal arts, philosophy, and theology using the acrostic PGMAPT.

Mortimer Adler and Robert Hutchins, both of the University of Chicago set forth in the 1930s to restore the "Great Books" of Western civilization to center stage in the curriculum. Adler and Hutchins sought to expand on the standard "classics" by including more modern works and trying to tie them together in the context of what they described as the "Great Ideas", in their book Great Books of the Western World. They were wildly popular during the 1950s, and discussion groups of aficionados were found all over the US. However, their popularity waned during the 1960s, and such groups are relatively hard to find today.  Extensions to the original set are still being published, encompassing selections from both current and older works which extend the "great ideas" into the present age.

Classical Christian education 

These schools tend to rely upon one or more of the visions of classical education represented by Dorothy Sayers' essay "The Lost Tools of Learning", Mortimer Adler's Paideia Proposal, Alfred North Whitehead's The Aims of Education, or Susan Wise Bauer's The Well Trained Mind. Classical Christian schools vary in their approach to the sectarian integration of Christian thinking. Some schools ask parents to sign a statement of faith before attending, some do not require this of parents but are clear in their sectarian teaching, others are consciously ecumenical.

Classical languages 
A more traditional view of classical education arises from the ideology of the Renaissance, advocating an education grounded in the languages and literatures of Greece and Rome. The lengthy, rigorous training period required to learn Greek and Latin has been abandoned by most American schools in favor of more contemporary subjects.

The revival of "classical education" has resulted in Latin (and less often Greek) being taught at classical schools.  The Association of Classical and Christian Schools requires Latin for accreditation. A new group of schools, the Classical Latin School Association, requires Latin to be taught as a core subject.

See also 
Trivium
Liberal arts
Western canon
Education reform
New Math
Grammar school
Sister Miriam Joseph Rauh
Ramism
:Category:Classical Christian schools

References 

Classical studies
Education by subject